Luis Felipe Vargas Velázquez (born June 8, 1983) is a Puerto Rican male artistic gymnast and part of the national team.  He participated at 2004 Summer Olympics. He also competed at world championships, including the 2010 World Artistic Gymnastics Championships in Rotterdam, the Netherlands.

Education

Luis Vargas completed a Master's Degree in Health Promotion at the University of Turabo (UT) in Puerto Rico, USA.

See also
 List of Pennsylvania State University Olympians

References

1983 births
Living people
Puerto Rican male artistic gymnasts
People from Río Piedras, Puerto Rico
Olympic gymnasts of Puerto Rico
Gymnasts at the 2004 Summer Olympics
Gymnasts at the 2007 Pan American Games
Gymnasts at the 2003 Pan American Games
Gymnasts at the 2011 Pan American Games
Gymnasts at the 1999 Pan American Games
Pan American Games silver medalists for Puerto Rico
Pan American Games medalists in gymnastics
Big Ten Athlete of the Year winners
Medalists at the 2011 Pan American Games
Penn State Nittany Lions men's gymnasts